Issara Sritaro (Thai อิสระ ศรีทะโร) is a Thai professional football coach and former player who is head coach of Thailand U23.

Managerial career
In November 2015, it was announced that Issara would become the new head coach of Chainat Hornbill again after he left the team in 2014 and came back in 2015 to 2016.

Managerial statistics

Honours

Manager
Individual 
Thai League 1 Coach of the Month: February 2022, March 2022

References

1980 births
Living people
Issara Sritaro
Issara Sritaro
Issara Sritaro
Issara Sritaro
Association football midfielders